Laura Citarella (born 1981) is an Argentine film director and producer. She has been noted as an emerging voice of the "New Argentine Cinema movement" or el Nuevo Cine Argentino. She is a core producer at the indie production company El Pampero Cine, and produced La flor, which at 868 minutes, currently holds the record for the longest running Argentine film in history.

Early life and education 
Citarella was born in 1981 in La Plata, Argentina.  She completed high school at Carlos N. Vergara in La Plata, Argentina and went on to attend the Universidad del Cine, from which she graduated with a degree in film directing in 2004.

Career

Teaching 
Aside from making films, Citarella also teaches at the Universidad Nacional de La Plata (UNLP), where runs a thesis workshop focused on scriptwriting.

La mujer de los perros (2015) 

Citarella and Verónica Llinás co-directed La mujer de los perros (Dog Lady), which garnered attention from international film festivals. Notably, it was an official selection for the Rotterdam Film Festival for 2015 and won Best Actress at the Buenos Aires International Festival of Independent Cinema.

In production 

Citarella is now working on a sequel to her 2011 film Ostende, titled Trenque Lauquen.

Filmography

Feature films directed

Short films directed

Complete filmography

Awards and nominations

External links

References 

1981 births
Argentine film producers
Argentine women film producers
Living people
Argentine film directors
Argentine women film directors